Holland's Got Talent is the Dutch member of the Got Talent television show franchise. The eighth season of Holland's Got Talent began on 8 April 2016 and ended on 3 June 2016.

Changes from previous seasons
Season 8 featured four judges for the first time, and a new host Johnny de Mol. It also marked the first time that the 'golden buzzer' was used, inspired by other shows in the Got Talent franchise. The golden buzzer sends an act straight through to the semi-finals. Each judge can press it only once during the entire season. The golden buzzer acts are shown in the following table.

Semifinals
The semi-finals premiered on 13 May 2016 to 27 May 2016; there were three semi-finals with nine acts in each. Three acts each week continued to the grand final - usually one with the public vote and the other two chosen by the judges. Semi-final 3 was different as two were sent through by the public and one by the judges' vote.
There was only one buzzer in the semi-finals as Dan buzzed Sixxpaxx. The Rocking Chairs were the only golden buzzer act that didn't make it to the finals.

Summary

Semi-final 1 (13 May 2016)

Semi-final 2 (20 May 2016)

Semi-final 3 (27 May 2016)

Grand Final (3 June 2016)

 Johnny de Mol announced the top three; all of the other contestants were eliminated.
 Chantal's golden buzzer act Bob Bullee finished in 3rd place.
 Angela's golden buzzer act Nick Nicolai won the eighth series of Holland's got talent while Mart Hoogkamer was runner-up.
 Nick Nicolai is the sixth singer to win the show.
 Nick Nicolai is the second golden buzzer or ticket act to win the show, the other being Amira Willighagen who was Gordon's golden buzzer/ticket in 2013 series 6.
Netherlands
2016 Dutch television seasons